Been Where? Did What? is an album by Californian punk rock band Tilt. It was released in November 2001 on Fat Wreck Chords. It consists of previously unreleased tracks and cover versions, recorded by the band between 1992 and 1999.

Track listing
 All songs written by Tilt, unless otherwise stated.
"White Homes" – 2:10      
"Addiction" – 2:12      
"Nuthin' from You" – 2:19      
"Crying Jag" – 2:26      
"Dead Bum" – 2:27      
"Come Across" – 2:32      
"Unlucky Lounge" – 2:12      
"Loyalty" – 1:56      
"Worse to Bad" – 2:02      
"Can't Listen" – 2:01      
"Berkeley Pier" – 3:13      
"Fuck Up" – 1:01      
"Vendorhead" – 1:54      
"Pfeifernuzen Revisited" – 1:48      
"Not Going Anywhere" – 1:54      
"Where in the World Is Carmen Sandiego" (Altman, Yazbek) – 2:22      
"Theme from the Dukes of Hazzard (Good Ol' Boys)" (Jennings) – 1:27      
"Helpful Hint" – 1:50      
"It's Who You Know" (Cervenka, Doe) – 1:56      
"Old Crow" – 1:35      
"Kowtow" – 2:13      
"Torch" – 2:33

Credits 
 Cinder Block – vocals
 Jeffrey Bischoff – guitar
 Pete Rypins – bass
 Gabe Meline – bass
 Jimi Cheetah – bass
 Vincent Camacho – drums
 Engineered by Bart Thurber, Kevin Army, Andy Ernst, Billie Joe Armstrong, and Neill King
 Remixed by Ryan Greene

References 

Tilt (band) albums
2001 compilation albums
Fat Wreck Chords compilation albums